Real Talk is a daily talk show in the Philippines, premiering on September 7, 2015, on CNN Philippines as part of its launch of lifestyle shows where it mainly focuses on the issues of women and lifestyle airing weekdays at 9:30 AM to 10:00 AM and replays at 4:00 PM to 4:30 PM (PST). It is hosted mainly by triathlete mother Christine Jacob-Sandejas and originally co-hosted by comedian Giselle Sanchez and Binibining Pilipinas Universe 2011 Shamcey Supsup. For its second and third season, the show is hosted by Sandejas and singer Rachel Alejandro. The show ended on December 29, 2017.

Hosts
Main hosts
Christine Jacob-Sandejas
Rachel Alejandro

Former hosts
Giselle Sanchez (2015)
Shamcey Supsup-Lee (2015)

See also
 List of programs previously broadcast by Radio Philippines Network

References

Philippine television talk shows
2015 Philippine television series debuts
2017 Philippine television series endings
CNN Philippines original programming
English-language television shows